This article contains A-Z tables of the incidence of intentional homicide in multi-municipal metropolitan areas and standalone municipalities with a predominantly urbanized population. It does not take into consideration capricious political divisions widely used in the media to represent a city, such as city proper or suburban municipalities. The urban population for each entry is required to be at least 100,000.

Some cities are considered to be larger than the official metropolitan area or municipality determined by a country's respective government. Conversely, some cities are also considered to be significantly smaller than their official metro area(s) designations. Because of this and the continual growth of most cities that might not immediately be captured, the widest neutrally-sourced boundaries for each city are used. This includes the crossing of international borders.

1980s by count

1980s by rate per 100,000

1990s by count

1990s by rate per 100,000

2000s by count

2000s by rate per 100,000

2010s by rate

2010s by count

See also
 List of countries by intentional homicide rate
 List of cities by murder rate
 List of United States cities by crime rate (2012). 250,000+
 United States cities by crime rate (100,000–250,000)
 United States cities by crime rate (60,000-100,000)
 List of federal subjects of Russia by murder rate
 List of Brazilian states by murder rate
 List of Mexican states by homicides

References

Homicide
Homicide by city
City